Judith Thurman (b. 1946) is an American writer, biographer, and critic. She is the recipient of the  1983 National Book Award for nonfiction for her biography Isak Dinesen: The Life of a Storyteller. Her book Secrets of the Flesh: A Life of Colette was a finalist for the 1999 nonfiction National Book Award. In 2016, she received the medal of Chevalier of the Order Of Arts And Letters.

She is a staff writer for The New Yorker magazine.

Early life and education 
In 1967, Thurman graduated from Brandeis University with a Bachelor of Arts for her post-secondary education.

Early work 
She began her literary career as a poet and translator. The Covent Garden Press, in London, published her first book of poems, Putting My Coat On, in 1972. 

In the 1970s, Atheneum, in New York, published I Became Alone, a book of essays on women poets, for young people, and a volume of poetry for children, Flashlight, which has been regularly anthologized for more than forty years.

In 1973, Thurman returned to New York after five years in Europe and began to contribute to the newly launched Ms. magazine. Her essays introduced relatively unknown women writers to a new audience. They included the French poet Louise Labé and the Mexican poet Juana Inés de la Cruz. Thurman's translations of their work appeared in the Penguin Book of Women Poets. She also wrote about Gertrude Stein, Jean Rhys, Caryl Churchill, and Isak Dinesen, among others. Thurman worked at Brooklyn College as an adjunct professor from 1973 to 1975. For the remainder of the 1970s, Thurman had three publications while writing a biography.

Writing career

Biographies 
In the mid 1970s, Thurman began writing a biography on Isak Dinesen after being convinced by a representative from St. Martin's Press. During her eight year writing process, Thurman stopped writing her biography after experiencing writer's block and anxiety. After resuming her writing, Thurman's biography, Isak Dinesen: The Life of A Storyteller, was published by St. Martin's Press in 1982. It won the National Book Award for nonfiction, in 1983, and served as the basis for Sydney Pollack's Academy Award-winning film, Out of Africa, on which Thurman served as an Associate Producer.

Thurman took a leave to write a biography titled "Colette: Secrets of the Flesh", which was published by Knopf in 1999. The book  was noted as "effective at setting the morally subversive Colette in the social milieu of early-20th-century Paris." The biography won the Los Angeles Times Book Award for biography and the Salon Book Award for biography.

The New Yorker 
In 1987, Thurman began contributing to The New Yorker. In 2000, she returned to The New Yorker as a staff wrtier, where she specialized in cultural criticism for over 20 years. A collection of her essays for the magazine, Cleopatra's Nose: 39 Varieties of Desire, was published by FSG in 2007, and was a New York Times Best Book of the Year.

Thurman is a recipient of the Harold G. Vursell Award for prose style, from the American Academy of Arts and Letters; the Ordre des Arts et des Lettres, from the French government; and the Rungstedlund Prize, from the Royal Danish Academy.

Bibliography

Poetry 
Collections

Biographies 
 Isak Dinesen: The Life of a Storyteller (1983)
 Secrets of the Flesh: A Life of Colette (1999)

Essay collections

Essays and reporting

References

External links

1946 births
Living people
20th-century American women writers
21st-century American women
The New Yorker staff writers